Luigi Sestili (born 9 July 1983) is an Italian former professional road cyclist.

Major results

2004
 1st Stage 5 Thüringen Rundfahrt der U23
 1st Young rider classification, Triptyque Ardennais
 4th Road race, National Under-23 Road Championships
 6th Ronde van Vlaanderen U23
 7th Gran Premio della Liberazione
 7th Grand Prix Joseph Bruyère
2005
 1st Overall Giro delle Regioni
1st Stage 2
 3rd GP Capodarco
 3rd Cronoscalata Internazionale Gardone
 4th GP Palio del Recioto
 4th Coppa Colli Briantei Internazionale
 5th Ruota d'Oro
2006
 9th Overall Circuit de Lorraine
2007
 3rd Giro del Medio Brenta
2008
 9th GP Industria & Artigianato
 10th Trofeo Matteotti

References

External links

1983 births
Living people
Italian male cyclists
People from Civitavecchia
Cyclists from Lazio
Sportspeople from the Metropolitan City of Rome Capital